Turquoise & Crimson (Online Version) is the collection of Turquoise 3.x and Crimson 3.x released in a span from 2002 to 2004 online through VAST's website.  EPs titled Turquoise 3.x and Crimson 3.x were released in lo-fi mp3 quality before being compiled onto the online release entitled Turquoise & Crimson.  After the two EPs were released, many of the songs found their way onto the major-label backed album Nude with different mixes before finding their way onto the official double album release.  However, there are two versions of Turquoise & Crimson; an official online version and an official "final" release released to retail.

The songs were created during and after a short four-year hiatus instituted by Jon Crosby so he could do some "soul-searching".  Many of the songs reflect the rough time in Crosby's life after the release of Music for People and the split between himself and a major-label.

The songs on the online release are the same versions as the retail CD, however production and sound quality on the Retail Version is of higher quality.

Track listing

Disc 1: Turquoise 3.x
"Turquoise" – 3:19
"Ecstasy" – 3:29
"Be With Me" – 3:53
"Thrown Away" – 4:00
"Don't Take Your Love Away" – 4:53
"Falling from the Sky" – 3:05
"Candle" – 4:01
"I Woke Up L.A." – 3:30
"I Can't Say No (To You)" – 4:12
"Desert Garden" – 3:17

Disc 2: Crimson 3.x
"I Need to Say Goodbye" – 3:23
"Lost" – 2:37
"Winter in My Heart" – 3:36
"All I Found Was You (Japanese Fantasy)" – 3:25
"That's My Boy" – 3:54
"Evil Little Girl" – 3:59
"Beautiful" – 3:33
"Señorita" – 2:50
"Where It Never Rains" – 3:30
"Goodbye" – 3:04

VAST albums
2006 albums